Kaley Nikole Fountain (born July 1, 1988) is an American professional soccer player. She previously played for FC Gold Pride, Atlanta Beat, and Western New York Flash of Women's Professional Soccer and was a member of the United States U-20 women's national soccer team squad that won the 2008 FIFA U-20 Women's World Cup.

Early life

Wake Forest University
Fountain attended Wake Forest University. At Wake Forest, she played in 86 games, starting in 81 of them.  In 2009, she claimed the number four spot on single-season goals for Wake Forest after scoring eleven goals.  She also had ten assists that season.  Fountain would later return to Wake Forest as an assistant coach.

Playing career

Club

FC Gold Pride
Fountain was drafted by FC Gold Pride in the second round of the 2010 WPS Draft. She played five games for the Pride before signing with the Atlanta Beat for the remainder of the 2010 Women's Professional Soccer season.

Atlanta Beat
Fountain signed as a free agent with the Atlanta Beat midway through the 2010 season. She made five appearances for the team, starting two of those matches.

Western New York Flash
In November 2010, Fountain signed with the Western New York Flash for the 2011 Women's Professional Soccer season. With the Western New York Flash, she helped clinch the 2011 WPS Championship.

Seattle Reign FC
Fountain was selected by Seattle Reign FC in the 2013 NWSL Supplemental Draft, but decided not to play in the new National Women's Soccer League.

International
Fountain has represented the United States at the U-20 and U-23 levels. She was a member of the U-20 U.S. Women's National Team that won the 2008 FIFA U-20 Women's World Cup in Chile and played with the U-20 U.S. women's national team during the Pan Am Games in the Summer of 2007.

References

External links
 
 Atlanta Beat player profile
 US Soccer player profile
 Wake Forest player profile
 

1988 births
Living people
American women's soccer players
Soccer players from Austin, Texas
Footballers at the 2007 Pan American Games
FC Gold Pride players
Atlanta Beat (WPS) players
Western New York Flash players
Wake Forest Demon Deacons women's soccer players
Women's association football defenders
Women's association football forwards
Pan American Games silver medalists for the United States
United States women's under-20 international soccer players
Pan American Games medalists in football
Medalists at the 2007 Pan American Games
OL Reign draft picks
Women's Professional Soccer players